Onchidella accrensis is a species of air-breathing sea slug, a shell-less marine pulmonate gastropod mollusk in the family Onchidiidae.

Description
This species was first described by Ludwig Hermann Plate in 1893.

Distribution
Reinhold Wilhelm Buchholz collected the specimens used for the first scientific description of this species on the sea off Accra, Ghana.

References

Onchidiidae
Gastropods described in 1893